Ivan Silych Goryushkin-Sorokopudov (November 5, 1873 – December 29, 1954) was a painter working in the Russian Empire and the Soviet Union.

Biography
Ivan Goryushkin-Sorokopudov was born in Nashchi Village of Tambov Governorate. His father was a burlak.

Gallery

References

1873 births
1954 deaths
People from Sasovsky District
People from Yelatomsky Uyezd
Painters from the Russian Empire
Soviet painters
Soviet educational theorists
Soviet printmakers
Recipients of the Order of the Red Banner of Labour